Solus is a genus of moths in the family Saturniidae first described by Watson in 1913.

Species
Solus drepanoides (Moore, 1866) - Photos here
Solus parvifenestratus (Bryk, 1944) - Photos here

References

Saturniinae